Joseph Guillermo Jones II (born July 15, 1976), better known by his stage name Jim Jones (or Jimmy Jones), is an American rapper, music video director, and record executive. He is an original member of the hip hop collective the Diplomats (also known as Dipset) alongside longtime friend and fellow Harlem native Cam'ron.

In 2004, he released his debut solo album On My Way to Church. The release of his second album, Harlem: Diary of a Summer in 2005, coincided with Jones landing an executive position in A&R at Entertainment One Music. A year later he was on his third album Hustler's P.O.M.E. (Product of My Environment) (2006), which spawned his biggest single to date, "We Fly High". The song reached number five on the US Billboard Hot 100 chart and was certified platinum by the Recording Industry Association of America (RIAA).

Jones' first major-label album Pray IV Reign was released in March 2009 by Columbia Records. The album spawned the hit single "Pop Champagne" (with Ron Browz featuring Juelz Santana). In April 2011, Jones released his fifth album, Capo, which was supported by the lead single, "Perfect Day" (featuring Chink Santana). He returned in May 2019, for his sixth album titled El Capo.

Early life

Jones, son of an Aruban mother and Puerto Rican father, was raised in Harlem mainly by his maternal grandmother.

Music career

2004–05: On My Way to Church and Harlem: Diary of a Summer
On My Way to Church is Jones' debut album. The album spawned two singles that made the US Billboard Hot R&B/Hip-Hop Songs chart: "Certified Gangstas" (featuring Cam'ron, Bezel and The Game), which reached number 80, and "Crunk Muzik" (featuring his Dipset cohorts Cam'ron and Juelz Santana), which reached number 84. The album peaked at number 18 on the US Billboard 200 chart, number three on Billboard's Independent Albums chart, and number four on the Top R&B/Hip-Hop Albums chart.

Harlem: Diary of a Summer, Jones' second album, reached number five on the Billboard 200 and topped the Top R&B/Hip-Hop Albums and Independent Albums charts, selling 350,000 copies. Three of its singles placed on the Billboard R&B/Hip-Hop Songs chart: "Baby Girl", which reached number 58; "Summer Wit' Miami", which reached number 78; and "What You Been Drankin' On?" (featuring Diddy, Paul Wall, and Jha Jha), which reached number 106.

2006–09: Hustler's P.O.M.E., Pray IV Reign and The Rooftop
Jones' third album Hustler's P.O.M.E. (Product of My Environment), was more commercial and once again featured Dipset members along with Lil Wayne. The album spawned Jones' biggest single to date, "We Fly High". Jones introduced a signature dance move in the "We Fly High" video, throwing up a fake jump shot every time the ad-lib "Ballin!'" was stated in the song. This dance move became so popular that it inspired Michael Strahan and Plaxico Burress to do the dance move after big plays during a Monday Night Football game in 2006.

From 2006 to 2008, Jones released a collaborative album with his rap group ByrdGang, titled M.O.B.: The Album, which peaked at number 29 on the Billboard 200, selling 16,000 the first week in stores and eventually selling 65,000 units. He has two Christmas compilation albums, A Dipset X-Mas and A Tribute To Bad Santa Starring Mike Epps, and a load of mixtapes, including Harlem's American Gangster, which peaked at number 19 on the Billboard 200 chart and spawned his single "Love Me No More".

Jones' fourth studio album, Pray IV Reign, released March 24, 2009, was his major record label debut. The album peaked at number nine on the Billboard 200 chart. On July 8, Jones released a promotional single titled "The Good Stuff" featuring NOE. The album features "Pop Champagne", producer Ron Browz, and Juelz Santana. A bonus track on the album is "Jackin' Swagga From Us" with Twista, NOE, and Lil Wayne, which takes shots at T.I. and Jay-Z for allegedly stealing their styles and mocking their song "Swagga Like Us". It is his first solo album under Columbia Records. In 2009, Jim Jones became Vice President of Urban A&R at Koch Records, which is now E1 Music. On June 11, Jim Jones appeared on BET's 106 & Park along with DJ Webstar and announced that they will be releasing an album together titled The Rooftop. He also announced that his documentary, This Is Jim Jones, will be released June 30, 2009. The first single from the album is "Dancin on Me", featuring Juelz Santana. It was officially released via iTunes on April 28. On September 22, hip hop website, RapRuckus, stated the album was scheduled for an October 6, 2009 release. The second single is titled "She Can Get It". In late 2009, Jones left Columbia. According to XXLMag.com, Jones signed a deal to release his next solo album on E1, as well as a mixtape.

2010–present: Capo, Dipset reunion and Vampire Life series
The mixtape, titled The Ghost of Rich Porter, was released March 23, 2010. In April 2010, Cam'ron and Jim Jones announced they ended their feud. On June 26, 2010, Jones reunited with Cam'ron and Juelz Santana on a track titled "Salute", marking the return of the Diplomats. They have begun working on an album together, and have been reportedly working with Dr. Dre. In 2010 it was confirmed that Jones had started up a new record label imprint with Damon Dash entitled Splash Records. On April 5, 2011, Jones' released his fifth studio album, Capo, on E1. On November 3, Jones released a mixtape, titled Capo Life, to promote the album and celebrate the launch of his new website. The lead single off Capo, "Perfect Day" featuring Chink Santana and LOGiC, was released on iTunes December 7, 2010. The album is the first to feature Cam'ron since Hustler's P.O.M.E. (Product of My Environment). Other guest appearances include rappers Game, Lloyd Banks, Prodigy, Raekwon and R&B singers Rell and Ashanti among others, and features notable production from longtime collaborator Chink Santana, Aaron LaCrate, Wyclef Jean, Drumma Boy and Lamont "LOGiC" Coleman. The album peaked at number 20 on the Billboard 200, selling 21,000 copies in its first week, making Capo his lowest charting album to date.

On October 1, 2011, when Funkmaster Flex premiered a song on New York City's Hot 97 titled "It Ain't My Fault" featuring rappers T-Rex, Boogie Black and Sen City, it was revealed that it was the first offering from Webstar and Jones' upcoming second collaborative effort The Rooftop 2. In the summer of 2011, he was featured on Randyn Julius "Party Tonight" with Teyana Taylor and fellow Dispet member Cam'ron. On October 30, 2011, for the Halloween holiday, Jones released a mixtape titled Vampire Life: We Own the Night. The tape features twenty-four songs, including bonus tracks, freestyles and guest appearances from Meek Mill, J.R. Writer, Chink Santana, 2 Chainz, Maino, Yo Gotti and Jadakiss among others.

On May 1, 2012, Jones released the second installment of his Vampire Life series entitled Vampire Life 2, it went on to be downloaded over 300,000 times on mixtape-sharing website DatPiff.
On March 11, 2013, Jones announced he was working on two new mixtapes V3 (Vampire Life 3) and The Ghost Of Rich Porter 2. Vampire Life 3 was released on August 13, 2013. On December 3, 2013, Jim Jones released an extended play (EP), titled We Own the Night. The EP was supported by the single "Nasty Girl", featuring American singer Jeremih. On June 24, 2014, Jones released a single titled "Wit the Shit", featuring American singer Trey Songz. In July 2014, Jones revealed he would be releasing another EP, titled We Own the Night Pt. 2: Memoirs of a Hustler; it was released on September 9.

On January 1, 2015, DJ Funkmaster Flex announced via Instagram that he had spoken to fellow Diplomat members Cam'ron, Jim Jones and Juelz Santana about an upcoming Diplomats mixtape which included fellow member Freekey Zeekey. He also stated that he would be hosting the mixtape along with DJs/producers DJ Khaled, Swizz Beatz and DJ Mustard.

Other ventures

Byrd Gang

Jones introduced Byrd Gang in 2008. The group released their debut album, M.O.B.: The Album on Asylum Records.

Fashion designing
Jones and Damon Dash co-own "Vampire Life Clothing".

Acting career
Jones made his acting debut in the film State Property 2.He also appeared on the show Crash: The Series. Along with releasing the album Capo, Jones headlined in an off-Broadway musical called Hip-Hop Monologues: Inside the Life and Mind of Jim Jones, produced by Damon Dash and Footage Entertainment.

Reality television
Jones also appears in seasons 1 and 2 of the VH1 show Love & Hip Hop: New York (which premiered March 14, 2011 and November 11, 2011, respectively); the show loosely follows events in his personal life and that of his fiancée, Chrissy Lampkin. Jones also stars in season 1 of the VH1 show Chrissy & Mr. Jones; the show follows him and Lampkin, focusing on their personal lives.

Sports management
In December 2017, he became part owner of the Richmond Roughriders of the American Arena League.

Controversies

Junior M.A.F.I.A.
At an altercation at the Rucker, members of Junior Mafia physically assaulted rap group, the Diplomats including Jim Jones. Jones was seen on camera, fleeing the altercation.

Tru Life
In a 2006 interview Tru Life, responding to rumors, called Dipset bosses Cam'ron and Jim Jones "bitches." Jones responded by challenging Tru Life to fisticuffs, with a US$50,000 wager. Tru Life responded by stealing Jones' necklaces and taunting him on the 2007 mixtape Tru York, which featured "a Photoshopped Jim Jones in a Borat-style thong and Cam'ron as a Seventh Avenue transsexual hooker" as the cover. The Diplomats retaliated by hacking Tru Life's MySpace page, replacing the faces on the Tru York cover with True Life's and Jay-Z's.

GUCCI
In February 2022 Jones posted an Instagram video in which he detailed his experience of being racially profiled as a result of receiving poor customer service. He expressed his disappointment in Gucci’s employees by claiming that “These black people are more racist than white people when they get they job”. He goes on to further detail the event that left him a victim by explaining “I still ain’t get no sparkling water, I still ain’t get no champagne. I still ain’t get nothing.”

Jay Z
Jim Jones has criticized Jay Z's performance as president of Def Jam Recordings. Jay Z responded with a "diss" track called "Brooklyn High" over the beat from Jones' "We Fly High".

On December 22, 2008, Jones punched and kicked a "friend and colleague" of Jay Z at a Manhattan Louis Vuitton store; he pleaded guilty to misdemeanor assault the following November.

ASAP Mob
In a 2014 interview Jim Jones characterized ASAP Mob's style as "not street": "[T]hey're artistic, but they're not from the street... We got bonafide swag and the definition of get fly... Price point and high fashion don't really make it cool." ASAP Mob member ASAP Rocky responded in his solo single "Multiply" by criticizing that characterization as a disingenuous ploy to sell overpriced branded merchandise.

Azealia Banks
In July 2012, a social media-related conflict between Jim Jones and rapper Azealia Banks had started after Banks disrespected the rapper for getting more credit for her phrase "Vamp", as in Jones' mixtape series and label of the same name, Vampire Life, or his track "Vamp Life". Enraged, Banks disrespected Jim Jones again via a track titled "Succubi".

Discography

Solo albums
 On My Way to Church (2004)
 Harlem: Diary of a Summer (2005)
 Hustler's P.O.M.E. (Product of My Environment) (2006)
 Pray IV Reign (2009)
 Capo (2011)
 Wasted Talent (2018)
 El Capo (2019)
Collaboration albums
 The Rooftop (with DJ Webstar) (2009)
 The Fraud Department (with Harry Fraud) (2021)
 Gangsta Grillz: We Set The Trends (with DJ Drama) (2022)
 The Lobby Boyz (with Maino) (2022)
 Back In My Prime (with Hitmaka) (2023)

Filmography

Awards and honors
"Pop Champagne" was nominated for Best Collaboration at the 2009 Urban Music Awards.

See also

 List of Puerto Ricans
 The Diplomats

References

External links

 Official website
 
 

1976 births
American music industry executives
American music video directors
American people of Aruban descent
American people of Puerto Rican descent
Businesspeople from New York City
Columbia Records artists
MNRK Music Group artists
Hispanic and Latino American male actors
Hispanic and Latino American rappers
Living people
People from Harlem
The Diplomats members
Rappers from the Bronx
Rappers from Manhattan
Gangsta rappers
Participants in American reality television series
African-American male rappers
21st-century American rappers
Bloods